Gil Bispo is a settlement in the middle of the island of Santiago, Cape Verde. It is part of the municipality of Santa Catarina. It lies 1 km northeast of Assomada city centre. In 2010 its population was 998.

References

Villages and settlements in Santiago, Cape Verde
Santa Catarina, Cape Verde